Deus Nemausus is often said to have been the Celtic patron god of Nemausus (Nîmes). The god does not seem to have been worshipped outside this locality. The city certainly derives its name from Nemausus, which was perhaps the sacred wood in which the Celtic tribe of the Volcae Arecomici (who of their own accord surrendered to the Romans in 121 BC) held their assemblies. Or perhaps it was the local Celtic spirit guardian of the spring that originally provided all water for the settlement, as many modern sources suggest. Or perhaps Stephanus of Byzantium was correct in stating in his geographical dictionary that Nemausos, the city of Gaul, took its name from the Heracleid (or son of Heracles) Nemausios.

An important healing-spring sanctuary existed in the town; it was established in some form at least as early as the early Iron Age but was expanded after the Romans colonised the region in the late 2nd century BC, when there was active Roman encouragement of the cult. Another set of local spirits worshiped at Nemausus (Nîmes) were the Nemausicae or Matres Nemausicae, who were fertility and healing goddesses belonging to the spring sanctuary.

References 

 Green, Miranda (1997) Dictionary of Celtic Myth and Legend.  London: Thames and Hudson Ltd.

Gaulish gods
Roman gods
Tutelary deities
Nîmes